Saray Khumalo (born 1972) is a Zambia-born, South Afican explorer and mountaineer. In May 2019, she became the first black African woman to reach the summit of Mount Everest.

Personal life 
With a Rwandan bloodline but now resident in South Africa, Khumalo was born in Zambia. She works as an e-commerce business executive. She is a mother of two children.

Mountain climbing 
Prior to her 2019 success, she had attempted several times to conquer Mount Everest. Her first attempt was in 2014, when she was halted after an avalanche that killed 16 guides on the slope. She tried again in 2015 but was halted again by an earthquake in Nepal. Her final try, before her success, was in 2017 where she was forced to turn back because of the terrible weather.

She is also known to have summited six mountains, including Mount Kilimanjaro in Tanzania, Aconcagua in Argentina and Mount Elbrus in Russia.

Mountaineering summit 
 Mount Aconcagua (Argentina) in 2015
 Mount Kilimanjaro (Tanzania) in 2012 
 Mount Elbrus (Russia) in 2014 
 Mount Everest (Nepal) in 2019 
 Mount Denali (United States) in 2022 
 Vinson Massif (Antarctica) in 2022

Polar Expeditions 
 South Pole - last degree (Antarctica) in 2019

Philanthropy 
Khumalo is a Nelson Mandela Libraries ambassador who raises funds through her mountain climbing to support several projects including iSchoolAfrica, the Lunch Box Fund and the Mandela Library project in Thembisa, Johannesburg.

References

Living people
1972 births
South African mountain climbers
South African sportswomen
South African explorers
Female explorers